Enrique Ruiz Paz (born January 30, 1967 in Madrid, Spain) is a retired basketball player.

Clubs
1986-87: Real Madrid
1987-91: CB Collado Villalba
1991-92: CB Estudiantes
1991-92: CB Llíria

References
 ACB profile

1967 births
Living people
Spanish men's basketball players
Liga ACB players
Real Madrid Baloncesto players
CB Estudiantes players
Basketball players from Madrid
20th-century Spanish people